Pulmonary capillary hemangiomatosis (PCH) is a disease affecting the blood vessels of the lungs, where abnormal capillary proliferation and venous fibrous intimal thickening result in progressive increase in vascular resistance. It is a rare cause of pulmonary hypertension, and occurs predominantly in young adults. Together with pulmonary veno-occlusive disease, PCH comprises WHO Group I' causes for pulmonary hypertension. Indeed, there is some evidence to suggest that PCH and pulmonary veno-occlusive disease are different forms of a similar disease process.

Presentation

These are non specific. Typical symptoms include dyspnea, cough, chest pain and fatigue.

Genetics

At least some cases appear to be due to mutations in the eukaryotic translation initiation factor 2-alpha kinase 4 (EIF2AK4) gene.

Diagnosis

Lung biopsy is essential to make this diagnosis. This can be difficult if the pulmonary pressure is high.

Investigations

Chest X ray may show enlargement of the heart and ill-defined patchy lesions in the lung fields.

CT chest typically shows wide spread ill-defined centrilobular nodules of ground glass opacity. This is a nonspecific finding and may be seen in a number of pulmonary diseases.

CT pulmonary angiography usually shows enlargement of the main pulmonary artery.

When measured by echocardiography or pulmonary angiography, the pulmonary arterial pressure is typically elevated.

Differential diagnosis
 Pulmonary veno-occlusive disease

Associations

This condition has been reported in patients with Ehlers Danlos syndrome, CREST syndrome and scimitar syndrome.

Treatment

The only definitive treatment for this condition currently is lung transplantation.

Median survival without treatment is 3 years.

Imatinib may be of use.

Epoprostenol does not appear to be of use.

Epidemiology

The prevalence of this disease is estimated to be < 1/million. The usual age at presentation is between 20 and 40 but it has been reported in the newborn.

History

This condition was first described in 1978.

Animals
This condition has been reported in cats. and dogs.

References

External links 

Lung disorders
Rare diseases
Pulmonology